The BMO Center (formerly known as BMO Harris Bank Center and Rockford MetroCentre) is a multi-purpose arena located in downtown Rockford, Illinois. It is currently home to the AHL's Rockford IceHogs hockey team. The arena formerly served as the home of several defunct minor league sports teams, including the Rockford Lightning basketball team, the Rock River Raptors indoor football team, and the Rockford Rampage indoor soccer team.

The BMO Center also secured a spot in history when it hosted the first Arena Football League test game in 1986 between the Chicago Politicians and the Rockford Metros. Due to its outdoor appearance, it is often referred to as the "Big Orange Box", although IceHogs officials refer to the arena as "the Barnyard".

History

The opening night gala in 1981 was headlined by Bob Hope and Lynda Carter.  Certainly, the most significant event in BMO Center history occurred in the inaugural year, when The Rolling Stones made an appearance on their 1981 North American Tour on October 1, 1981. The concert was added to the tour in response to a radio station petition drive. The actual petitions were cut up and used to hold a lottery for the right to buy tickets. Each person drawn could purchase two of the $15 tickets.

The facility hosted the 1984 and 1986 Mid-American Conference men's basketball tournaments as well as numerous IHSA basketball sectional and super-sectional tournaments. In addition to athletic events, it hosts concerts, conventions, and local high school graduations.

Arena information
The BMO Center hosts major concerts, sport events, and other large-scale events. The complex houses press boxes, a lounge, and suites to watch sport events in style, and a multi-purpose arena.

Naming rights
On August 11, 2011 it was announced that BMO Harris Bank had reached a long term agreement with the Rockford IceHogs for the naming rights of the venue. It was effectively renamed the BMO Harris Bank Center. On October 20, 2022 the name was changed again to just the BMO Center.

Renovations
In 2006, the city of Rockford, along with Winnebago County, announced plans to issue $23 million in bonds to fund a massive renovation of the Arena.  Key to the plan was an agreement with the Chicago Blackhawks to put an American Hockey League (AHL) team in Rockford for the next 10 years. This team acts as the Blackhawks' farm team. The MetroCentre authority purchased an AHL franchise, and bought the rights to name it the "IceHogs."

During the summer of 2013, the seating structure in the building's lower level was replaced, making way for a new, updated seating system. New seats were added and the seating capacity for hockey increased to 5,895, up from 5,767. Along with new seats, the visitors' locker room was also expanded. New lights were added and the concourse was renovated. Renovations were completed due to the hard work and effort of Patrick Conery.

References

External links
Official website

Bank of Montreal
Basketball venues in Illinois
College basketball venues in the United States
Continental Basketball Association venues
Indoor arenas in Illinois
Indoor ice hockey venues in Illinois
Indoor soccer venues in Illinois
Rockford IceHogs
Rockford Lightning
Sports venues in Rockford, Illinois
Tourist attractions in Rockford, Illinois
Buildings and structures in Rockford, Illinois
Event venues established in 1981
Sports venues completed in 1981
1981 establishments in Illinois